Rapsodia Bałtyku  (Baltic Rhapsody) is a Polish melodrama film from 1935 directed by Leonard Buczkowski. It is the story about two friends, Adam and Zygmunt, serving in the floatplanes escadrille of the Polish Navy.

It is notable for an appearance of Polish destroyer ORP Wicher (actually the first modern warship ever built for the Polish Navy) and Lublin R-XIII floatplanes.

 Screenplay – Konrad Tom
 Dialogs – Jan Adolf Hertz
 Scenography – Jacek Rotmil, Stefan Norris
 Music – Tadeusz Górzyński
 Text of the songs – Jerzy Jurandot

Cast
 Maria Bogda – Janka Zatorska
 Barbara Orwid – Ewa Zatorska
 Adam Brodzisz – Adam Halny
 Mieczysław Cybulski – Zygmunt Zatorski, Ewa's husband
 Jerzy Marr – Jerzy Jedyński
 Lala Górska – Jędruś Zatorski
 Stanisław Sielański – Przędza
 Paweł Owerłło – commander Zieliński
 Maria Kaupe – singer
 Monika Carlo – Franciszka

External links 

1930s Polish-language films
1935 drama films
1935 films
Polish black-and-white films
Polish drama films
Melodrama films